Pasaia is a railway station in Pasaia, Basque Country, Spain. It is owned by Euskal Trenbide Sarea and operated by Euskotren. It lies on the San Sebastián-Hendaye railway, popularly known as the Topo line. The Cercanías San Sebastián station  is located close to the Euskotren station, but the two are not connected.

History 
The station opened in 1912 as part of the San Sebastián-Hendaye railway. The station was built in a viaduct as otherwise six level crossings would have been required in the town.

Works started in early 2022 and their completion is scheduled for 2027. The elevated station will be demolished after the new station enters service.

Services 
The station is served by Euskotren Trena line E2. It runs every 15 minutes during weekdays and weekend afternoons, and every 30 minutes on weekend mornings.

References

External links
 

Euskotren Trena stations
Railway stations in Gipuzkoa
Railway stations in Spain opened in 1912